Professor Philip Nolan is the Director General of Science Foundation Ireland since January 2022. He previously served as chair of NPHET's Irish Epidemiological Modelling Advisory Group from March 2020 to February 2022, president of Maynooth University from August 2011 to October 2021, deputy president of University College Dublin for academic affairs and registrar from 2004 to 2011, and was a medical and surgical intern at St. Vincent's University Hospital from 1991 to 1992.

Early life
Nolan was born in Dublin, Ireland. He attended University College Dublin and received a Bachelor of Science degree in physiology in 1988, the primary medical degree in 1991 and Doctor of Philosophy degree in 2003.

Career
Nolan joined the staff of University College Dublin in 1996.  He received a UCD President's Research Award in 2000 and a UCD President's Teaching Award in 2002. He served as director of the UCD Conway Institute from 2003 to 2004, at the UCD Health Sciences Centre. Nolan was appointed Deputy President for Academic Affairs and Registrar of University College Dublin in July 2004. He worked with the then president Hugh Brady in the development in undergraduate and graduate education, student administration and information technology services. 

On 15 August 2011, Nolan was appointed president of Maynooth University, leaving his position as deputy president of University College Dublin. 

From March 2020 to February 2022, he served as the chair of the Irish Epidemiological Modelling Advisory Group on the COVID-19 pandemic in the Republic of Ireland.

On 8 March 2021, it was announced that Professor Eeva Leinonen, former Vice-Chancellor of Murdoch University would succeed Nolan as president of Maynooth University from 1 October 2021.

In May 2021, he was elected a member of the Royal Irish Academy.

In October 2021, it was announced that Nolan would become Director General of Science Foundation Ireland in January 2022.

Personal life
Nolan has two daughters, Rachel and Aoife.

References

Living people
Year of birth missing (living people)
Date of birth missing (living people)
Academics of University College Dublin
Alumni of University College Dublin
Academics of Maynooth University
Members of the Royal Irish Academy
Science Foundation Ireland